Pseudodoliops elegans is a species of beetle in the family Cerambycidae. It was described by Heller in 1916, originally under the genus Diatylus.

References

Apomecynini
Beetles described in 1916